The Pseudopimelodidae are a small family (about 40 species) of catfishes known as the bumblebee catfishes or dwarf marbled catfishes. Some of these fish are popular aquarium fish.

Taxonomy
This family was formerly a subfamily of Pimelodidae. Pseudopimelodidae is a monophyletic group. Previously, the superfamily Pseudopimelodoidea was sister to superfamilies Sisoroidea + Loricarioidea. However, some evidence has shown this family, along with Pimelodidae, Heptapteridae, and Conorhynchos, may form a monophyletic assemblage, which contradicts the hypothesis that the former family Pimelodidae that included these families is a polyphyletic group.

Distribution
The Pseudopimelodidae are restricted to fresh water in South America, from the Atrato River in Colombia to Argentina in the Río de la Plata.

Description
These catfishes have wide mouths, small eyes, and short barbels. Their bold markings lead them to be commonly known as bumblebee catfishes or dwarf marbled catfishes. B. acanthochiroides grows to 80.0 cm (31 in) TL. However, most species are smaller; species of the genus Microglanis rarely exceed 70 mm(2.8 in) SL and are never over 80 mm (3.1 in) SL.

References

 
Fish of South America
Catfish families
Taxa named by Francisco Mago Leccia